Sheikh Rehana Siddiq (born 13 September 1955) is a Bangladesh Awami League politician. She is the younger sister of Prime Minister Sheikh Hasina and the daughter of the Father of the Nation Bangabandhu Sheikh Mujibur Rahman. She is also the mother of Tulip Siddiq, who is a British Labour Party politician and elected Member of Parliament (MP) for the Hampstead and Kilburn constituency.

Early life 
Sheikh Rehana was born to Sheikh Mujibur Rahman, the first president of Bangladesh, and Sheikh Fazilatunnesa Mujib. She was placed under house arrest in Dhanmondi along with her family by the Pakistan Army during Bangladesh Liberation War. She was in West Germany with her elder sister Sheikh Hasina when her family was assassinated in a military coup by the Bangladesh Army.

Career 
Sheikh Rehena was allocated a government house in Dhanmondi for "Token" 100 taka in 2001 by the government of Bangladesh. The building was used to house her personal staff. The allocation was cancelled when Bangladesh Nationalist Party came to power. In 2014 she was allocated a house in Gulshan after Awami League came to power for a token price of 1001 taka. In 2015 she and her children were given lifelong protection by the government of Bangladesh through the Special Security Forces. The government also announced free utility for life for her and her family. She was made councilor of Awami League Dhaka South unit in 2016.

Personal life 
Sheikh Rehana is married to Shafique Ahmed Siddique, retired professor of Department of Accounting & Information Systems, Faculty of Business Studies (FBS), University of Dhaka. Her son, Radwan Mujib Siddiq Bobby, is a councilor of Bangladesh Awami League. Her daughter, Tulip Siddiq, is a Member of Parliament for the Labour Party in the United Kingdom House of Commons for the Hampstead and Kilburn constituency, her other daughter is Azmina Siddiq.

References 

1957 births
Living people
Bangladeshi Muslims
Awami League politicians
Sheikh Mujibur Rahman family
Children of national leaders
Bangladeshi people of Arab descent